A solar deity is a god or goddess who represents the Sun, or an aspect of it, usually by its perceived power and strength. Solar deities and Sun worship can be found throughout most of recorded history in various forms. The following is a list of solar deities:

African
 Anyanwu, Igbo god believed to dwell in the Sun
 Magec, Tenerife goddess of the Sun and light
 Mawu, Dahomey goddess associated with the Sun and the Moon
 uMvelinqangi, Xhosa and Zulu people's god of the Sun and sky
 iNyanga, Zulu people, goddess of the Moon
 Ukhulukhulwanaa star, Zulu people's ancestor who came from the stars. He taught them to build huts and taught them the high laws of isiNtu

Egyptian mythology
 Amun, creator deity sometimes identified as a Sun god
 Aten, god of the Sun, the visible disc of the Sun
 Atum, the "finisher of the world" who represents the Sun as it sets
 Bast, cat goddess associated with the Sun
 Hathor, mother of Horus and Ra and goddess of the Sun
 Horus, god of the sky whose right eye was considered to be the Sun and his left the Moon
 Khepri, god of the rising Sun, creation and renewal of life
 Ptah, god of craftsmanship, the arts, and fertility, sometimes said to represent the Sun at night
 Ra, god of the Sun
 Sekhmet, goddess of war and of the Sun, sometimes also plagues and creator of the desert
 Sopdu, god of war and the scorching heat of the summer Sun

American

Aztec mythology
 Huitzilopochtli, god of the Sun and war
 Nanahuatzin, god of the Sun
 Teoyaomicqui, god of lost souls, the Sun, and the sixth hour of the day
 Tonatiuh, god of the Sun and ruler of the heavens

Brazilian mythology
 Guaraci, god of the Sun (Guarani mythology)
 Meri, folk hero and god of the Sun

Incan mythology
 Inti, god of the Sun and patron deity of the Inca Empire
 Ch'aska ("Venus") or Ch'aska Quyllur ("Venus star") was the goddess of dawn and twilight, the planet

Inuit mythology
 Akycha, Sun goddess worshiped in Alaska
 Malina, goddess of the Sun found most commonly in the legends of Greenland

Maya mythology
 Ah Kin, god of the Sun, bringer of doubt, and protector against the evils associated with darkness
 Hunahpu, one of the Maya Hero Twins; he transformed into the Sun while his brother transformed into the Moon
 Kinich Ahau, god of the Sun

Muisca mythology
 Sué, god of the Sun and husband of Chía, the Moon

Other Amerindian mythology
 Jóhonaaʼéí, the Navajo Sun god, known as "The One Who Rules the Day"
 Kisosen, the Abenaki solar deity, an eagle whose wings opened to create the day and closed to cause the nighttime
 Napioa, the Blackfoot deity of the Sun
 Tawa, the Hopi creator and god of the Sun
 Wi, Lakota god of the Sun

Asian

Ainu mythology
 Chup Kamui, a lunar goddess who switched places with her brother to become goddess of the Sun

Arabian mythology
 Malakbel, god of the Sun
 Shams/Shamsun, a solar goddess exalted in Himyar and by the Sabaeans.

Armenian mythology
 Ar, Arev, the Sun god with its people as "children of the Sun"

Buddhist mythology
 Marici, goddess of the heavens, the Sun, and light
 Surya, god of the Sun (Suriya Pariththa, Suthra Pitaka, Pali canon, Theravada Buddhism)

Canaanite mythology
 Shapash, goddess of the Sun

Chinese mythology

 Doumu, Sun goddess sometimes conflated with Marici.
 Xihe, Sun goddess and mother of the ten suns
 Yu Yi, god that carries the Sun across the sky
 Xu Kai, god of the Sun star

Elamite
 Nahundi, god of the Sun and law

Filipino mythology

Init-init: the Itneg god of the Sun married to the mortal Aponibolinayen; during the day, he leaves his house to shine light on the world
Chal-chal: the Bontok god of the Sun whose son's head was cut off by Kabigat; aided the god Lumawig in finding a spouse
Mapatar: the Ifugao sun deity of the sky in charge of daylight
Sun God: the Ibaloi deity who pushed up the skyworld and pushed down the underworld, creating earth, after he was hit by a man's arrow during the war between the peoples of the skyworld and the underworld
Elag: the Bugkalot deity of the Sun, worshiped with the moon and stars; has a magnificent house in the sky realm called Gacay; retreats to his home during nights; giver of light and growth
Apo Init: the Ilocano deity of the sun
Amman: the Ilocano god of the Sun, where the sun is his eye
Agueo: the morose and taciturn Pangasinense sun god who is obedient to his father, Ama; lives in a palace of light
Algao: the Aeta Sun god who battled the giant turtle Bacobaco
Mangetchay: also called Mangatia; the Kapampangan supreme deity who created life on earth in remembrance of his dead daughter; lives in the Sun; in other versions, she is the creator and net-weaver of the heavens
Aring Sinukûan: the Kapampangan Sun god of war and death, taught the early inhabitants the industry of metallurgy, wood cutting, rice culture and even waging war; lives in Mount Arayat, and later included a female form
Apolaki: the Tagalog god of sun and warriors; son of Anagolay and Dumakulem; sometimes referred as son of Bathala and brother of Mayari; ruler of the world during daytime
Quadruple Deities: the four childless naked Tau-buid Mangyan deities, composed of two gods who come from the Sun and two goddesses who come from the upper part of the river; summoned using the paragayan or diolang plates
Adlao: the Bicolano son of Dagat and Paros; joined Daga's rebellion and died; his body became the sun; in another myth, he was alive and during a battle, he cut one of Bulan's arm and hit Bulan's eyes, where the arm was flattened and became the earth, while Bulan's tears became the rivers and seas
Unnamed God: a Bicolano Sun god who fell in love with the mortal, Rosa; refused to light the world until his father consented to their marriage; he afterwards visited Rosa, but forgetting to remove his powers over fire, he accidentally burned Rosa's whole village until nothing but hot springs remained
Sanghid: the Waray giant who wove cloth on a gold loom with supernatural speed; has the power to move back the Sun
Liadlao: the gold-bodied Bisaya son of Lidagat and Lihangin; killed by Kaptan's rage during the great revolt; his body became the Sun
Adlaw: the Bisaya Sun deity worshiped by the good
Launsina: the Capiznon goddess of the Sun, Moon, stars, and seas, and the most beloved because people seek forgiveness from her
Magrakad: the Tagbanwa god found at exactly noontime on the other side of the Sun; gives the warmth which sustains life and, when the people are ill, carries away sickness
Tumangkuyun: wash and keep clean the trunks of the two sacred cardinal trees in Sidpan and Babatan by using the blood of those who have died in epidemics; the blood he uses causes the colors of the sunrise and sunset
Libtakan: the Manobo god of sunrise, sunset, and good weather
Unnamed Gods: the Bagobo gods whose fire create smoke that becomes the white clouds, while the Sun creates yellow clouds that make the colors of the rainbow
Kadaw La Sambad: one of the two T'boli supreme deities; married to Bulon La Mogoaw; lives in the seventh layer of the universe
Lageay Lengkuos: the greatest of Teduray heroes and a shaman (beliyan) who made the earth and forests; the only one who could pass the magnet stone in the straight between the big and little oceans; inverted the directions where east became west, inverted the path of the Sun, and made the water into land and land into water
Sun Deity: the divine Maranao being depicted in an anthropomorphic form as a flaming young man; angels serve as his charioteers

Hindu mythology

 Aryaman, god of the midday Sun
 Savitr, god of the sun at sunrise and sunset
 Surya, the Sun god, rides across the sky in a horse-drawn chariot à la Helios and Sol
 Mitra, often associated with the Sun
 Mihir, meaning Sun.
 Aruna, charioteer of Surya, god of the morning Sun.
 Tapati, Sun goddess.

Hittite mythology
 Istanu, goddess/god of the Sun and judgment
 Sun goddess of Arinna
 Sun god of Heaven, daylight god of judgement
 Sun goddess of the Earth, infernal goddess of the underworld.

Japanese mythology

 Amaterasu, goddess of the Sun

Mesopotamian mythology
 Shamash, Akkadian god of the Sun and justice
 Utu, Sumerian god of the Sun and justice
Šerida, Sumerian goddess of light, married to the god of the Sun (Akkadian name Aya)

Scythian religion
 Tabiti, ancient Iranian goddess possibly connected with the Sun.

Tocharian
 A "sun deity" (kaum näkte), possibly a goddess.

Turkic mythology
 Gun Ana, common Turkic solar deity, seen as a goddess in the Kazakh and Kyrgyz traditions
 Koyash, god of the Sun

Persian mythology
 Mithra, often associated with the Sun.
 Hvare-khshaeta, the Sun yazata

Zunism
 The Zunbil dynasty and the subjects of Zabulistan worshiped the Sun, which they called Zun. They believed that the Sun was the god of justice, the force of good in the world and, consequently, the being that drove out the darkness and allowed man to live another day.

Vietnamese mythology
 Goddess Thần Mặt Trời, the embodiment of the sun, the daughter of Ông Trời, old sister of Thần Mặt Trăng, she and her sister have a husband who is a bear, when the Bear God wants to meet them, a solar or lunar eclipse will appear.

European

Baltic mythology

 Saulė, goddess of the Sun

Basque mythology
 Ekhi, goddess of the Sun and protector of humanity

Celtic mythology
 Áine, Irish goddess of love, summer, wealth, and sovereignty, associated with the Sun and midsummer
 Alaunus, Gaulish god of the Sun, healing, and prophecy
 Belenos, Gaulish god of the Sun
 Étaín, Irish Sun goddess
 Grannus, god associated with spas, healing thermal and mineral springs, and the Sun
 Lugh, Sun god as well as a writing and warrior god
 Macha, "Sun of the womanfolk" and occasionally considered synonymous with Grian
 Olwen, female figure often constructed as originally the Welsh Sun goddess
 Sulis, British goddess whose name is related to the common Proto-Indo-European word for "Sun" and thus cognate with Helios, Sól, Sol,  and Surya and who retains solar imagery, as well as a domain over healing and thermal springs. Probably the de facto solar deity of the Celts.

Etruscan mythology
 Usil, Etruscan equivalent of Helios

Finnish mythology
 Päivätär, goddess of the Sun

Germanic mythology
 Sól/Sunna/Sunne, the common Sun goddess among the Germanic peoples, who according to Nordic mythology is chased across the sky in her horse-drawn chariot by a wolf

Greek mythology
Helios, god and personification of the Sun who drives across the sky in a chariot
 Apollo, god of the Sun and light, among others. His most common epithet is Phoebus (“Radiant”)
 Eos, goddess and personification of the dawn
 Hemera, goddess of the day
 Electryone, goddess of the sunrise

Hungarian mythology
 Nap Király, the Hungarian god of sun who rides his silver fur horse everyday from east to west. 
 Nap Anya, Goddess of the sun and partner of Nap király

Lusitanian mythology
 Endovelicus, god of health and safety, worshipped both as a solar deity and a chthonic one
 Neto, potentially both a solar and war deity
 A possible sun goddess, whose cult has become that of Virgin Mary Nossa Senhora de Antime.

Minoan mythology
 Possibly the Snake Goddess.

Proto-Indo-European mythology 

 Sehul
 eye of Dyēws

Roman mythology
 Aurora, goddess of dawn
 Sol, god of the Sun, rides in a horse-drawn chariot

Sami mythology
 Beiwe, goddess of the Sun, spring, fertility, and sanity

Slavic mythology
 Dažbog, god of the Sun
 Hors, god of the Sun

Oceania

Australian Aboriginal mythology
 Bila, cannibal sun goddess of the Adnyamathanha
 Gnowee, solar goddess who searches daily for her lost son; the light of her torch is the Sun
 Wala, solar goddess
 Wuriupranili, solar goddess whose torch is the Sun
 Yhi, Karraur goddess of the sun, light and creation

Māori mythology
 Tama-nui-te-rā, personification of the Sun

See also
 List of lunar deities
 Dawn goddess

References

Lists of deities